In theoretical physics, Rajesh Gopakumar and Cumrun Vafa introduced in a series of papers new topological invariants, called Gopakumar–Vafa invariants, that represent the number of BPS states on a Calabi–Yau 3-fold. They lead to the following generating function for the Gromov–Witten invariants on a Calabi–Yau 3-fold M:

 ,

where 
  is the class of pseudoholomorphic curves with genus g,
  is the topological string coupling,
  with  the Kähler parameter of the curve class ,
  are the Gromov–Witten invariants of curve class  at genus ,
  are the number of BPS states (the Gopakumar–Vafa invariants) of curve class  at genus .

As a partition function in topological quantum field theory 
Gopakumar–Vafa invariants can be viewed as a partition function in topological quantum field theory. They are proposed to be the partition function in Gopakumar–Vafa form:

Notes

References 

Quantum field theory
Algebraic geometry
String theory